A Roy Rogers is a non-alcoholic mixed drink made with cola and grenadine syrup, and traditionally garnished with a maraschino cherry. The drink's lack of alcoholic content allows it to be served in lieu of alcoholic drinks to those who cannot or do not drink alcohol.

The drink originated in the 1940s and is named after American actor and singer Roy Rogers (1911–1998), who was popular at the time. It was likely named after Rogers because he did not drink alcohol.

The Roy Rogers is similar to other non-alcoholic beverages, specifically the Shirley Temple, which follows a similar recipe but uses ginger ale or lemon-lime soda instead of cola. The Roy Rogers was reportedly sold as a "boy version" of the Shirley Temple in the 1950s and 1960s.

See also
 Shirley Temple (drink)
 Arnold Palmer (drink)
 Queen Mary (cocktail)
 Cherry cola
 List of cocktails

References 

Non-alcoholic mixed drinks
Roy Rogers